Wyatt Beau Roy (born 22 May 1990) is a former Australian parliamentarian. He served as the Assistant Minister for Innovation from September 2015 to the July 2016 federal election. He was a Liberal National Party of Queensland (LNP) member of the Australian House of Representatives from August 2010 to July 2016, representing the electorate of Longman. At 20 years of age, he was the youngest person ever to be elected to an Australian parliament. The federal record was previously held by Edwin Corboy, who was 22 when elected in 1918. He also became the youngest Minister in the history of the Commonwealth, being appointed to the ministry at the age of 25.

Personal life

Roy was raised on a strawberry farm north of Brisbane. He has two older half-brothers and a younger sister. Roy attended Matthew Flinders Anglican College on the Sunshine Coast, and studied at Melbourne's La Trobe University before returning to his home state to study political science and international relations at the University of Queensland, although he did not graduate.

Political career
Prior to the election, there was speculation that the Liberal National Party did not want Roy endorsed as the candidate for Longman, because of his youth. However, both Liberal leader Tony Abbott and Nationals leader Warren Truss publicly endorsed Roy.

Roy's campaign was not without incident. His electoral success may have been helped by a gaffe made by his Labor opponent and incumbent member, Jon Sullivan. In the closing week of the 2010 federal election campaign, Sullivan gained national media attention due to a blunder where he criticised the father of a seven-year-old child with a disability for waiting two years on a Queensland Health waiting list, responding to a question at a candidates' forum with a counter-question. Sullivan apologised to the father at the first available opportunity and dismissed the significance of the gaffe, in the days following his defeat. A week earlier, one of Roy's campaign volunteers was involved in an incident, captured on video. The footage shows a member of Roy's campaign team hitting a Labor supporter in the face while campaigning. The LNP claimed the attack was provoked and brought about by the Labor campaign worker holding a giant L-plate sign next to a poster of Roy.

Roy is a supporter of same-sex marriage in Australia and supported a conscience vote on the issue in parliament.

In 2015, Roy was appointed as Assistant Minister for Innovation, an outer ministry position assisting the Minister for Industry, Innovation and Science.

In the Australian federal election in 2016, Roy lost the seat of Longman to Labor MP Susan Lamb by a margin of 3%, with an 8.45% swing to Labor.

Post political career
In 2016, he visited a warzone in Iraq where he became caught up in a firefight between Islamic State (IS) and Kurdish Peshmerga forces, earning criticism from among others Prime Minister Malcolm Turnbull.

Roy later joined Afiniti, a global artificial intelligence company, as its Australian general manager. He is based in Sydney.

See also
 Baby of the House, an unofficial title given to the youngest member of a parliamentary house

References

External links

 
 

|-

1990 births
Australian people of Indian descent
Government ministers of Australia
Liberal National Party of Queensland members of the Parliament of Australia
Living people
Members of the Australian House of Representatives
Members of the Australian House of Representatives for Longman
Turnbull Government
21st-century Australian politicians